Sam Kornhauser is a former American football player and coach. He was as the first head football coachat Stony Brook University, serving from 1984 to 2005 and compiling a record of 105–110.

Kornhauser was a standout athlete at Missouri Valley College in Marshall, Missouri.

Head coaching record

References

Year of birth missing (living people)
Living people
Missouri Valley Vikings football players
Norwich Cadets football coaches
Stony Brook Seawolves football coaches
High school football coaches in New York (state)
Southern Illinois University alumni
University of Vermont alumni